Tovrea is a surname. Notable people with the surname include:

Edward A. Tovrea (1861–1932), American cattle baron
Philip Edward Tovrea Jr. (1920–1982), American World War II veteran

See also
Tovrea Castle
Tovrea Stockyards